Segundo Corral Alto Airfield is an airport serving Segundo Corral (es), a mountain resort in the Los Lagos Region of Chile.

The runway has an additional  overrun on the west end. The nearest community is Lago Puelo in Argentina.

There is mountainous terrain in all quadrants. Approach and departure are terrain limited.

See also

Transport in Chile
List of airports in Chile

References

External links
OpenStreetMap - Segundo Corral Alto
OurAirports - Segundo Corral Alto
FallingRain - Segundo Corral Alto Airport

Airports in Chile
Airports in Los Lagos Region